Okatana Constituency is an electoral constituency in the Oshana Region of Namibia. It had 15,562 inhabitants in 2004 and 9,111 registered voters . Its district capital is the settlement of Okatana.

Politics

Oktana constituency is traditionally a stronghold of the South West Africa People's Organization (SWAPO) party. In the 2015 local and regional elections the SWAPO candidate won uncontested and became councillor after no opposition party nominated a candidate. The SWAPO candidate won the 2020 regional election by a large margin. Edmund Iishuwa obtained 3,477 votes, followed by George Uusiku of the Independent Patriots for Change (IPC), an opposition party formed in August 2020, with 715 votes.

References

Constituencies of Oshana Region
States and territories established in 1992
1992 establishments in Namibia